Antoniy Daniel Chukvebuka Emere (born 27 May 2002) is a Ukrainian professional footballer who plays as a left-back for Ukrainian First League club Hirnyk-Sport Horishni Plavni on loan from Metalist 1925 Kharkiv.

References

External links
 
 

2002 births
Living people
Footballers from Kharkiv
Ukrainian people of Nigerian descent
Ukrainian footballers
Ukraine youth international footballers
Association football defenders
FC Shakhtar Donetsk players
FC Metalist 1925 Kharkiv players
FC Hirnyk-Sport Horishni Plavni players
Ukrainian First League players